Lucilo de la Peña (born 2 May 1921) is a Cuban fencer. He competed in the individual foil event at the 1948 Summer Olympics.

References

External links
 

1921 births
Possibly living people
Cuban male fencers
Olympic fencers of Cuba
Fencers at the 1948 Summer Olympics
People from Artemisa